Islamic eschatology is a field of study in Islam concerning future events that would happen in the end times. It is primarily based on sources from the Quran and Sunnah. Aspects from this field of study include the signs of the final age, the destruction of the universe and Judgement Day.

The general consensus of Muslim scholars agree there would be tremendous and distinctive signs before the world ends. Among which would be an era of trials and tribulations, a time of immorality followed by mighty wars, worldwide unnatural phenomena and the return of justice to the world. Defining figures are also prophesied such as the Mahdi, and the Second Coming of Jesus who bring about a heavenly victory against the Antichrist ending with the release of Gog and Magog to the world. Once all the events are completed, the universe shall be destroyed and every human being would be resurrected to be held accountable for their deeds.

Sources for Islamic Eschatology 
Alike with other tenets of Islamic faith, sources of Islamic Eschatology are taken from two primary sources namely the Quran itself and Sunnah literature which are accounts of the traditions of Prophet Muhammad during his lifetime. These two foundational sources would pave the way for interpretations by later scholars such as al-Ghazali, Ibn Kathir, and Muhammad al-Bukhari.

Signs of the End Times 

The arrival of Judgement Day is prophesied to be preceded by apocalyptic signs of its arrival in various hadith collections.  
Senseless immorality would prevail. The prevalent of tyrants, alcohol, usury, satanic music, fornication, homosexuality, and disobedience by wives, murders, lying and cheating, disinterest in and ignorance of religion.
Unnatural phenomenons would occur. The rise of frequent sudden deaths, excessive lightning, destructive rainfall, terrible drought, a huge cloud of smoke, the opening up of huge cracks in the earth, the sun rising in the west, the breeze that take the souls of the faithful.
The appearance of dark, satanic evils such as the Antichrist, Gog and Magog, and Sufyani.
The arrival of messianic saviors such as the Mahdi and Jesus, who along with divine intervention, will restore justice.
The signs are divided into two categories.  Minor signs are uneventful signs that happen in the timeframe of centuries. Major signs are seismic events that happen very rapidly and is the immediate precursor to the end.

Savior and evil-doing  figures that appear in the major signs include:
Al-Masih ad-Dajjal, is blind in one eye, and will deceive starving masses –  especially the Jews –  by performing miracles.  He will raise an army that will kill and conquer, and corner his nemesis, the Mahdi, along with a small army of Muslim fighters in Jerusalem. Jesus will descend from heaven just in time to kill him and defeat his army.

 The Mahdi, i.e. the "Rightly Guided One", is a messianic figure descended from Muhammad through Ali, who (with the help of Jesus) will defeat the Dajjal, reestablish Islamic law, rid the world of bid'a (religious innovation),  and  fill it with justice; (Sunni and Shia disagree on details such as whether he is currently alive, will kill the Dajjal himself, what he looks like, his exact ancestry, etc.) 
 Jesus will make a second coming, descending to earth, but unlike in Christianity it will be to assist the Mahdi by killing the dajjal,  "break[ing] the cross, kill[ing] the pigs, and abolish[ing] the Jizya tax", i.e. put an end to Christians  misconceptions about his being the Son of God and there being no need to follow dietary laws.  Jesus and the Mahdi will then rule the earth in perfect justice for a time before Judgement Day. (Shia believe it is the Mahdi who will kill the dajjal; others believe "the Mahdi" is not a distinct person but just the title given to Jesus.)
 Gog and Magog are mentioned in the Quran as doing "great mischief on earth", and being suppressed  by a figure called Dhul-Qarnayn ("the two-horned one") who builds a wall to contain their mischief, warning their local victims that when the time comes (believed to mean the end times), Allah will remove the barrier. Non-Quranic Islamic apocalyptic literature describes Gog and Magog as a subhuman pestilence who are released from thousands of years of imprisonment to do much killing, pillaging and devouring of vast resources until being wiped out after "God commands an insect or worm to burrow into their necks and kill them".
The Sufyani is a tyrant whose career of murdering innocent women and children will be cut short when he and his army are swallowed up by the earth on their way to seize and kill the Mahdi.

Small Resurrection 
Small Resurrection (al-qiyamah al-sughra) happens, when the soul is separated from the body. The soul then turns to the afterlife (akhira or malakut), where it is interrogated by two angels Munkar and Nakir.

Resurrection and final judgement

In Islam, "the promise and threat" (waʿd wa-waʿīd) of Judgment Day ( or ), 
has been called "the dominant message" of the Quran,
and is considered a fundamental tenet of faith by all Muslims, and one of the six articles of Islamic faith.  

The two themes "central to the understanding of Islamic eschatology" are:
 the resurrection of bodies joined with spirits in a "reunion of whole, cognizant, and responsible persons", and 
 a final judgment of the quality of each persons life "lived on earth and a subsequent recompense carried out with absolute justice through the prerogative of God's merciful will".

The trials, tribulations and details associated with it are detailed in the Quran and the hadith (sayings of Muhammad); these have been elaborated on in creeds, Quranic commentaries (tafsịrs), theological writing, eschatological manuals to provide more details and a sequence of events on the Day. Islamic expositors and scholarly authorities who have explained the subject in detail include al-Ghazali, Ibn Kathir, Ibn Majah, Muhammad al-Bukhari, and Ibn Khuzaymah.

Resurrection of the dead 

After the final signs of The Hour – the defeat of the Sufyani; the end of the just reign of the Mahdi and/or Jesus; the rising of the sun from the west; the peaceful death all believers from inhalation of a lethal breeze – a trumpet will blast, signaling the destruction of earth (Q.). A second blast will signal the death of any being still living.

The dead will then be resurrected and Afterlife commence with yet another trumpet blast, (different sources give different numbers of trumpet blasts) The first to arise will be Muhammad, followed by the other members of the Muslim community, with all gathering at the place of assembly [al-maḥshar]. In between resurrection and the actual judgement will be an agonizing time of waiting (Q., Q.) for unbelievers.

Separation of the righteous and the damned 
At divine judgment, the resurrected will stand in a grand assembly, each person's Book of Deeds –  where "every small and great thing is recorded" – will be read,  and ultimate judgment made.  The resurrected will then walk over the bridge of As-Sirāt, those judged worthy for the Garden continuing to their heavenly abode, those damned to The Fire, falling off the bridge into the pit of Jahannam. There will also be a punishment of the grave (for those who disbelieved) between death and the resurrection.

Not everyone consigned to hell will remain there, as it is believed by both scholars and lay Muslims that "all but the mushrikun, those who have committed the worst sin of impugning the tawḥīd of God, have the possibility of being saved;" and God's intercession to save sinners from hellfire is a "major theme" in popular Islamic stories about Judgement Day.

Eschatological theological questions
Scholars did not always agree on questions of who might go to hell; whether the creation of heaven and hell would wait until Judgement Day; whether there was a state between heaven and hell; whether those consigned to hell would be there for eternity.

Basis of belief
"Fear, hope, and finally ... faith", have been given (by Jane I. Smith, Yvonne Y. Haddad) as motivations offered by the Quran for the belief of Muslimsin an Afterlife, although some (Abū Aʿla al-Mawdūdī) have asserted it is simply a matter of reason:
The fact is that whatever Muhammad (peace be upon him) has told us about life after death is clearly borne out by reason. Although our belief in that Day is based upon our implicit trust in the Messenger of God, rational reflection not only confirms this belief but it also reveals that Muhammad's (peace be upon him) teachings in this respect are much more reasonable and understandable than all other view-points about life after death.

Early Muslim  thought on damnation
One of the primary beliefs pertaining to Islamic eschatology during the Early Muslim Period was that all humans could receive God's mercy and were worthy of salvation. These early depictions even show how small, insignificant deeds were enough to warrant mercy. Most early depictions of the end of days depict only those who reject Tawhid, (the concept of monotheism), are subject to eternal punishment. However, everybody is held responsible for their actions. Concepts of reward and punishment were seen as beyond this world, a view that is also held today.

Resurrection theories 
Although Islamic philosophers and scholars were in general agreement on a bodily resurrection after death, interpretations differ in regard to the specifications of bodily resurrection. Some of the theories are the following:

 The return to the same material body, someone had during lifetime, that will be restored.
 Conjunction of the soul with a Mithali body, which is congenial to the worlds of Barzakh and the Akhirah.
 Resurrection with a Hurqaliyati body, accordingly a second invisible body, that survives death.

Literal or allegorical
According to scholars Jane I. Smith, Yvonne Y. Haddad,  "the vast majority of believers", understand verses of the Quran on Jannah (and hellfire) "to be real and specific, anticipating them" with joy or terror.
Besides the material notion of the paradise, descriptions of it are also interpreted as allegories, whose meaning is the state of joy believers will experience in the afterlife. For some theologians, seeing God is not a question of sight, but of awareness of God's presence. Although early Sufis, such as Hallaj, took the descriptions of Paradise literal, later Sufi traditions usually stressed out the allegorical meaning. 

On the issue of Judgement Day, early Muslims debated whether scripture on should be interpreted literally or figuratively, and the school of thought that prevailed (Ashʿarī) "affirmed that such things as" connected with Judgement day as "the individual records of deeds (including the paper, pen, and ink with which they are inscribed), the bridge, the balance, and the pond" are "realities", and "to be understood in a concrete and literal sense."

Modernist, postmodernist thought

According to Smith and Haddad, "The great majority of contemporary Muslim writers, ... choose not to discuss the afterlife at all". Islamic Modernists, according to Smith and Haddad, express a "kind of embarrassment with the elaborate traditional detail concerning life in the grave and in the abodes of recompense, called into question by modern rationalists".   Consequently, most of "modern Muslim Theologians" either "silence the issue" or reaffirm "the traditional position that the reality of the afterlife must not be denied but that its exact nature remains unfathomable".

The beliefs of Pakistani modernist Muhammad Iqbal (died 1938), were similar to the Sufi "spiritual and internalized interpretations of hell" of ibn ʿArabī, and Rumi, seeing paradise and hell "primarily as metaphors for inner psychic" developments. Thus hellfire is actually a state of realization of one's failures as a human being", and not a supernatural subterranean realm. Egyptian modernist Muhammad ʿAbduh, thought it was sufficient to believe in the existence of an  afterlife with rewards and punishment to be a true believer, even if you ignored "clear" (ẓāhir) hadith about hell.

Gender equity
Some postmodernists have found at least one sahih (authentic) hadith on hell unacceptable—the tradition of the Prophet Muhammad stating, "most people in hell are women" has been explained as an attempt to "legitimate social control over women" (Smith and Haddad), or perpetuate "the moral, social, political, sectarian hierarchies" of medieval Islam (Lange). Amina Wadud notes that the Qur'an does not mention any specific gender when talking about Hell,  Q., for example,  states that "the guilty are immortal in hell's torment"; and when discussing paradise, includes women, Q., for example, states that "Beautiful of mankind is love of the joys (that come) from women and offspring..."

"Limbo" or al-aʿrāf in Islam 

In terms of classical Islam, "the only options" afforded by the Qur'an for the resurrected are an eternity of horrible punishments of The Fire or the delightful rewards of The Garden.  Islamic tradition has raised the question of whether or not consignment to the Fire is eternal, or eternal for all, but "has found no reason to amend" the limit of two options in the afterlife. But one verse in the Quran has "led to a great deal of speculation concerning the possibility of a third place".
There will be a barrier [ḥijāb] between Paradise and Hell. And on the heights [al-aʿrāf] of that barrier˺  will be people who will recognize ˹the residents of˺ both by their appearance. They will call out to the residents of Paradise, "Peace be upon you!" They will have not yet entered Paradise, but eagerly hope to (Q.).  
"What some have called" the "Limbo" Theory of Islam, as described by Jane Smith and Yvonne Haddad, implies that some individuals are not immediately sent to The Fire or The Garden, but are held in a state of limbo.  Smith and Haddad believe it is "very doubtful" that the Qur'anic meant for al-aʿrāf to be understood as "an abode for those ... in an intermediate category, but this has come to be the most commonly
held interpretation".

As for who the inhabitants of the   inhabits al-aʿrāf are, the "majority of exegetes" support the theory that they are persons whose actions balance in terms of merit and demerit –  whose good deeds keep them from the Fire and whose evil deeds keep them from the Garden. They will be the last to enter the Garden, at the mercy of their Lord.

The Current existence of the Afterlife 

There was considerable debate regarding whether heaven and hell exists at the current moment. The Mu'tazila argued that since the Quran states that once the trumpet sounds, all except God will be destroyed, this would include the destruction of  heaven and hell. However, the Ash'ariya argued that although the trumpet's sounding will precede all being destroyed, creation was a "constant process". Māturīdism also defends the idea that paradise and hell are coexisting with the temporal world. The attributes of paradise and hell would already take effect on this world (dunya). Abu al-Layth al-Samarqandi (944–983) states that the purpose of simultaneous existence of both worlds is that they inspire hope and fear among humans.

Evidence that Jannah and the Fire already exists is supported by a number of verses in the Quran. It is implied someone has gone to the Garden or the hell (3:169, 36:13-26, 66:10, 3:10-11, 6:93). In the Story of Adam and Eve, they once resided in Garden of Eden, which is often considered to be Jannah. This identification, however, is not universal. Al-Balluti (887 – 966) reasoned that the Garden of Eden lacked the perfection and eternal character of a final paradise: Adam and Eve lost the primordial paradise, while the paradisiacal afterlife lasts forever; if Adam and Eve were in the otherworldly paradise, the devil (Shaiṭān) could not have entered and deceive them, since there is no evil or idle talk in paradise; Adam slept in his garden, but there is no sleep in paradise. 

Besides the Quranic allusions, hadiths are taken into consideration to evaluate the afterlife's coexistence with the temporary world. Reports pertaining to the Night Journey (Mi'raj) state that Muhammad saw visions of both destinations and creatures inhabiting it. Thus, heaven and hell are usually regarded as coexisting with the current world. According to another common tradition, Muhammad is supposed to have taken a pomegranate from jannah, and shared it with Ali, as recorded by Nasir al-Din al-Tusi. However, some scholars, like Ghazali, reject that Muhammad grabbed the fruit, argued he had only a vision instead.

The Concept of Eternity 
In Classical Islam, there was a consensus among the theological community regarding the finality of Jannah (also called Heaven, paradise, the Gardens); after Judgement Day, faithful servants of God would find themselves here for eternity. However, some practitioners in the early Muslim community held that the other abode of the hereafter (hell/Jahannam), or at least part of that abode, might not be eternal. This belief was based upon an interpretations of scripture that since the upper, less tortuous levels of Hell were reserved for Muslims who were only in hell  for as long as God deemed necessary. Once Muslims had their sins purged and were allowed into heaven, these levels would be empty and the need for their existence gone. These interpretations are centered on verses 11:106–107 in the Quran, stating, 
"As for those who are wretched, they shall be in the Fire, wherein there shall be for them groaning and wailing, abiding therein for so long as the heavens and the earth endure, save as thy Lord wills. Surely thy Lord does whatsoever He wills". 
This possibility  that God may yet commute a sentence to Hell, interprets (parts of) hell as being similar in function to  Purgatory in Christianity, with the exception to this comparison being that Hell in this context is for the punishment of the sinner's complete body, as opposed to the only the soul being punished in Purgatory. Arguments questioning the permanence of Hell take the view that Hell is not necessarily solely there to punish the evil, but to purify their souls, whereas the purpose of the Garden is simply to reward the righteous.
Evidence against the concept of hell being in part temporary, is the Quran verse stating that Hell will endure as long as Heaven will, which has been established as eternal.

Predestination

Orthodox Islam teaches the doctrine of Qadar (aka Predestination, or divine destiny in Islam), whereby everything that has happened and will happen in the universe—including sinful human behavior—is commanded by God. At the same time, we human beings are responsible for our actions and rewarded or punished for them in the Afterlife.

Qadar/predestination/divine destiny, is one of Sunni Islam's six articles of faith and is mentioned in the Quran.  
"Nothing will ever befall us except what Allah has destined for us" (Q.).
"Allah leaves whoever He wills to stray and guides whoever He wills." (Q.).
Of course, the fate of human beings in the Afterlife is especially crucial. It is reflected in Quranic verses such as 
 Had We willed, We could have easily imposed guidance on every soul. But My Word will come to pass: I will surely fill up Hell with jinn and humans all together. (Q.).

Muhammad also talked about the doctrine of predestination multiple times during his mission.  Thus the consensus of the Sunni Muslim community has been that scripture indicates predestination. 
Nonetheless, some Muslim theologians have argued against predestination, (including at least some Shia Muslims, whose article of faith  includes Adalah (justice), but not Qadar. At least some Shia –  such as Naser Makarem Shirazi –  denounce predestination).

Opponents of predestination in early Islam, (al-Qadariyah, Muʿtazila) argued that if God has already determined everything that will happen, God's human creation cannot really have free will over decisions to do good or evil, or control of whether they suffer eternal torment in Jahannam—which is something that (the opponents believe) a just God would never allow to happen.  
While Qadar is the consensus of Muslims, it is also an issue scholars discourage debate and discussion about. Hadith narrate Muhammad  warning his followers to “refrain from speaking about qadar”; and according to the creed of Al-Tahawi, "the principle of providence" is such a secret that God did not let even angels, prophets and messengers in on the mystery.

Who will enter Heaven or hell 

Scholars do not all agree on who will end up in Jannah and who in Jahannam, and the criteria for deciding. Issues include whether all Muslims, even those who've committed major sins, will end up in Jannah; whether any non-Muslims will be saved or all will go to Jahannam.  
 
According to the Quran, the basic criterion for salvation in the afterlife is the belief in the oneness of God, angels, revealed books, messengers, as well as repentance to God, and doing good deeds (amal salih). This is qualified by the doctrine that ultimately salvation can only be attained through God's judgment. 

Muslim scholars mostly agree that ultimately all Muslims will be saved (though many may need to be purified by a spell in hellfire but disagree about the possibility for  salvation of non-Muslims.

The idea that jinn as well as humans could find salvation was widely accepted,  Like  humans, their destiny in the hereafter depends on whether they accept God's guidance. The surah Al-Jinn says:
And among us are those who have submitted ˹to Allah˺ and those who are deviant. So ˹as for˺ those who submitted, it is they who have attained Right Guidance.  And as for the deviant, they will be fuel for Hell.’” (Q.)
Angels, who are not subject to desire and do not commit sin, are found in both paradise and the Fire –  punishing sinners in hell, and  praising and serving humans (and jinn) in paradise.

Scholars
Muslim scholars arguing in favor of  non-Muslims' being able to enter paradise cite the verse: 
"Indeed, those who believed and those who were Jews or Christians or Sabians—those who believed in Allah and the Last Day and did righteousness—will have their reward with their Lord, and no fear will there be concerning them, nor will they grieve," (Q.). 
Those arguing against non-Muslim salvation regard this verse to have applied only until the arrival of Muhammad, after which it was abrogated  by another verse: 
 "And whoever desires other than Islam as religion—never will it be accepted from him, and he, in the Hereafter, will be among the losers. (Q.). 
Although the Quran acknowledges the Bible as gospel, rejecting Muhammad and his message is seen as a rejection of salvation by them.

According to Mohammad Hassan Khalil, on the subject of whether self-proclaimed non-Muslims might be allowed into Jannah, Islamic theologians can be classified as 
'Exclusivists' –  who maintain that only Muslims will be saved and that adherents of all other beliefs will burn in Hell. 
'Inclusivists' –  who also affirm that Islam is the path to Heaven, but that some others are actually on the same path (and will go to Jannah) though they call themselves non-Muslims and call their path by a different name.
 'Pluralists' –  assert that there are several religious traditions or interpretations that are equally effective saving their adherents from damnation,  regardless of the circumstances. 
 'Universalists' –  'believe that all of Hell's inhabitants will be admitted into Heaven following a significant period of time' suffering in hell. 
(In addition there are those who could be described as 'interim inclusivists' or  'ultimate universalists'.)

Based on these categories, four "well-known and particularly influential Muslim thinkers" can be sorted as: 
 al-Ghazālī –  "optimistic" or "liberal inclusivist",
 Ibn al-ʿArabī –  "liberal inclusivist" to "quasi-universalist", 
 Ibn Taymiyya and 
 Ibn Qayyim al-Jawziyya –  both universalists, (despite their status as "darlings" of "many who call themselves Salafīs"),
 Rashīd Riḍā –  was a lenient inclusivist to cautious universalist.
 Ibn Hazm –  "proclaimed that even the most upright and flawless moral-ethical monotheist is damned to Hell if he knows anything about a person named Muḥammad or a religion called Islam and does not join, while even the most brutal and immoral person who converts sincerely to Islam the moment before he dies, is saved". Furthermore, "any Muslim who does not agree is not a Muslim himself."

Ash'arism 

Ashʿarism (/æʃəˈriː/; Arabic: أشعرية: al-ʾAshʿarīyah), one of the main Sunni schools of Islamic theology, founded by the Islamic scholar, Shāfiʿī jurist, Abū al-Ḥasan al-Ashʿarī in the 10th century, is known for an optimistic perspective on salvation for Muslims, repeatedly addressing God's mercy over God's wrath. However,  according to Ash'arism, God is neither obligated to punish disobedience nor to reward obedience.

Ash'aris hold revelation necessary to understand good and evil, as well as religious truths. Accordingly, revelation is necessary to reach moral and religious truths and thus, people who hear from a prophet or messenger are obligated to follow the revealed religion. However, those who have not received revelation are not obligated, and can hope for salvation. 
Al-Ghazali
Ash'arite scholar al-Ghazali divided non-Muslims into three categories for purposes of the Afterlife according to Mohammad Hassan Khalil:

Those who never heard the message of Islam, who live in far away lands, such as the Byzantines ("Romans"). These will be forgiven.
Those who were only exposed to a distorted understanding of Islam and had no opportunity to hear the correct version. These too will be forgiven.
People who heard of Islam because they lived in neighboring lands and/or mixed with Muslims. These have no hope of salvation.
Of these three, only the last group would be punished.
Ghazali distinguished between the "saved" and "those who will attain success". Therefore, righteous non-Muslims will neither enter hell nor Jannah, but will stay in al-Araf (a realm between Jannah and Jahannam  inhabited by those who are neither entirely evil nor entirely good).

Maturidism 

Māturīdism (: al-Māturīdiyyah) is also one of the main Sunni schools of Islamic theology developed and formalized by the Islamic scholar, Ḥanafī jurist Abū Manṣūr al-Māturīdī in the 10th century. Māturīdi scholars are thought to have been less optimistic about the chances of sinners entering paradise than Ash'aris,  but more optimistic than Muʿtazila.  They agree that Muslims who have committed grave sins will be punished but generally acknowledge that even these people will eventually enter paradise. Regarding the fate of non-Muslims, scholars have different opinions. Māturīdism holds people responsible for believing in a creator due to their intellectual capacities, even if they haven't heard about any prophetic mission. 
While some (like Rifat Atay) regard Māturīdism to be exclusivistic, only allowing people who are Muslims to enter paradise, others argue that Māturīdi understood that "to believe in Islam" meant having a subjective conceptualization of God and his laws by reason alone. This fits the doctrine, upheld by Māturīdism, that human reason suffices to grasp good and evil, and arrive at religious truths. Accordingly, people are judged by their degree of understanding God's universal law, not by their adherence to a particular belief system. In modern times, Yohei Matsuyama largely agrees with this interpretation. According to Abu'l-Qasim Ishaq, children cannot be considered unbelievers, thus all of them go to paradise.

Muʿtazila 

Muʿtazila emphasized God's justice, free will, and the responsibility of each human being  for their actions. They have been called the  "best known exponents" of Qadariyah, the idea that human free will was necessary "as a guarantee of divine justice". Compared to Maturidi and Ashʿarī, Muʿtazila had the least amount of "salvific optimism".
The "divine threat" (al-wa'id) and "divine promise" (al wa'd) became key tenets of the Mu'tazilites, who  stressed that they applied to both Muslims and non-Muslims. This meant that those who committed grave or heinous  sins (Kabirah), even  Muslims, might denied entry to paradise forever. The only way for a grave sinner to be forgiven, many theologians believed, is by repentance (tawba). Mu'tazilites believed God's justice obligated Him to forgive those who had repented (other schools believed He was not so constrained). The Mu'tazilites stress on individual accountability meant a rejection of  intercession (Shafa'a) on behalf of the prophet Muhammad. Another controversial belief of many (but not all) Mu'tazilites was that  paradise and hell would be created only after Judgement Day. This meant rejection of the commonly accepted idea that paradise and hell coexist with the contemporary world. Their reasoning was that since God does everything for a purpose, and since paradise and hell are created to reward or punish people, they will only be created after judegement has been passed on people and they are assigned to these abodes.

Twelver Shia

Like most Sunni, Shia Islam hold that all Muslims will eventually go to Jannah.

On the fate of non-Muslims in the hereafter, Shia Islam (or at least cleric Ayatullah Mahdi Hadavi Tehrani of Al-Islam.org), takes a view similar to Ash'arism. Tehrani divides non-Muslims into two groups: the heedless and stubborn who will go to hell and the ignorant who will not "if they are truthful to their own religion": Those who are termed 'Jahil-e-Muqassir' (lit. 'culpable ignorant' –  jahil suggesting unbelief rather than literal ignorance). These are non-believers to whom the message of Islam has reached and who have understood its truthfulness. However, they are not prepared to accept the truth due to their obstinacy and stubbornness. This group deserves to be punished in Hell.
Those who are termed 'Jahil-e-Qasir' (lit. 'inculpable ignorant'). These are non-believers to whom the message of Islam has not reached, or it has been presented to them in a very incomplete and untruthful manner. Such people will attain salvation if they are truthful to their own religion.
(At least one Twelver Shia scholar 'Allama al-Hilli, insists that not only will non-Muslims be damned but suggests Sunni Muslim will be as well, as it is not possible for any Muslim to be ignorant of "the imamate and of the Return", and thus "whoever is ignorant of any of them is outside the circle of believers and worthy of eternal punishment." This statement is not indicative of all Shia eschatological thought.)

Also like mainstream schools, and unlike Muʿtazila, Twelver Shia hold that Jannah and hellfire "exist at present ... according to the Qur`an and ahadith". However, they will not "become fully apparent and represented" until Judgement Day. As for three other issues in Islamic eschatology: 
the differences between Adam and Eve's Garden of Eden, 
"the heaven or hell of one's actions which envelopes a person"; and 
the Barzakh state of "purgatory" in Islam after death and before Resurrection; in Shia Islam, 
these three "types" of jannah (or Jahannam) are "all simply manifestations of the ultimate, eternal heaven and hell".

Contemporary debate of non-Muslim fate 
Modernist scholars Muhammad Abduh and Rashid Rida rejected the notion that the People of the Book would be excluded from Jannah, based on Q. (see above).  The Fate of the unlearned is also a matter of dispute within Islamic theology.

Turkish theologian Süleyman Ateş cites the Quran  to argue that there are good and bad people in any religion, and that some Muslims may not enter paradise, but those who believe without doubt in the hereafter and a God without partners,  and who do good and useful deeds may enter paradise, whatever their religions.

On the other hand, those who argue that only Islam is the "completed" and "perfected", and that it is necessary to believe in the all teaching of God –  the prophets, the angels etc. –  insist that only Muslims can enter paradise.

The fate of Jews 
While "some traditional and contemporary commentators" have interpreted the Quran as condemning all Jews, Farid Esack argues this condemnation is neither "universal" nor "eternal", and asks, 'if the Qur'an is to consign the Jews to eternal damnation, then what becomes of the sacred text as a means of guidance for all humankind? Would that vision too be damned?'

An example of a line criticizing the Jews can be found in Surah 5: 
"The Jews say, 'God's Hand is shackled.' Shackled are their hands, and they are cursed for what they say. Nay, but His two Hands are outstretched, He bestows as He wills. Surely that which has been sent down unto thee from thy Lord will increase many of them in rebellion and disbelief. And we cast enmity and hatred among them till the Day of Resurrection. As often they ignite a flame for war, God extinguishes it. They endeavor to work corruption upon the earth. And God loves not thee workers of corruption." (Q.)

A Sahih hadith concerning Jews and one of the signs of the coming of Judgement Day has been quoted many times, (it became a part of the charter of Hamas).
 The Day of Judgement will not come about until Muslims fight the Jews, when the Jew will hide behind stones and trees. The stones and trees will say O Muslims, O Abdullah, there is a Jew behind me, come and kill him. Only the Gharkad tree, (the Boxthorn tree) would not do that because it is one of the trees of the Jews. 
However, some scripture praises the dedication of Jews to monotheism,  and this verse of the Qur'an in  surah 3, can be interpreted as taking a more reconciliatory tone: 
"They are not all alike. Among the People of the Book is an upright community who recite God's signs in the watches of the night, while they prostrate. They believe in God and the Last Day, enjoin right and forbid wrong, and hasten unto good deeds. And they are among the righteous. Whatsoever good they do, they will not be denied it. And God knows the reverent". (Q.) 
After reconciling the different descriptions, one can conclude that the transgressions of the "apes and pigs" are not indicative of the entire community, and that while some Jews are on their way to damnation, others are not.

Islamic eschatology among Muslims in 20th and 21st centuries

Prior to the 20th century, Islam had "strongly emphasized the hereafter" (ākhira).  Desire to counter colonialism and "achieve material and technological parity with the West" turned  modern thinkers to stress this world (dunyā), without suggesting ākhira was less important.  
The focus on end times/Eschatology in Islam has tended to occur among those less exposed to scholarly learning. In the 1980s however, it again became much more popular generally.  Islamic leaders and scholars have always urged Muslim to be prepared for Judgement Day, but "the particulars of the end of the world are not a mainstream concern in Islam," according to Graeme Wood.

However, in 2012 poll conducted by the Pew Research Center found that 50% or more respondents in several Muslim-majority countries (Lebanon, Turkey, Malaysia, Afghanistan, Pakistan, Iraq, Tunisia, Algeria, and Morocco) expected the Mahdi (the final redeemer according to Islam) to return during their lifetime. The expectation is most common in Afghanistan (83%), followed by Iraq (72%), Turkey (68%), Tunisia (67%), Malaysia (62%), Pakistan (60%), Lebanon (56%), and Muslims in southern Thailand (57%).

Stories of end times and doomsday tend to be passed on as bedtime stories or informal talk among the lay Muslims, rather than in the Imam's Friday khutbah.  "Even Muslims with low levels of knowledge have heard parts of parts of it", according to scholar Jean Pierre Filiu. In Islamic bookstores, their "dramatic and sensational stories of final battles between good and evil, supernatural powers, the ultimate rise of a Muslim elite," are naturally more attention getting than more orthodox/studious works on prayer, purity or the lives of exemplary Muslims. More official Muslim sources have often either kept quiet about apocalyptic hadith or outright denied  their existence—an example being Nihad Awad of the Council on American-Islamic Relations who stated "There is no apocalyptic bloodbath in Islam."

Popular Islamic pamphlets and tracts on the End Times have always been in circulation, but until around 2010 their "impact on political and theological thinking was practically nil" among Sunnis. Interest in the End Times is particularly strong among jihadis and "since the mid-2000s, the apocalyptic currents in jihadism have surged." As of 2011, the belief that the end of the world is at hand and will be precipitated by an apocalyptic Great Battle has been noted as a "fast-growing belief in Muslim countries" though still a minority belief. 

Shiʿi Islam
According to J.-P. Filiu, the uprising of the (Shiʿi) Mahdi Army in Iraq and July 2006 war between Israel and (Shiʿi) Hizbullah are "at least in part" a consequence of "mounting eschatological expectations" coming from copious literature preaching that the return of the Hidden Imam was imminent; literature emanating from  the Shiʿi seminaries and scholars of holy city of Najaf, Iraq, from Lebanon, and from Iran during the administration of its president Mahmoud Ahmadinejad. One Shiʿi Ayatollah, Muhammad Baqir al-Sadr, revered as "the fifth martyr" of Shiʿi Islam (killed by Saddam Hussein),  went to the trouble of trying to explain how the Hidden Imam could be over 1000 years old, and why the present is a propitious time for the reappearance of him. Muqtada al-Sadr's Mahdi army waged a violent struggle against the American military through 2004,  and its ranks swelled with thousands of recruits. Muqtada's political faction won seats in parliament. During Mahmoud Ahmadinejad's presidency (2005-2013), he shared with Iranians his "avowed conviction" that believers must actively work for the Mahdi's reappearance, despite this bringing him "into conflict with the highest authorities of Shiism".

Popular apocalyptic literature
"Dramatic and sensational stories" of the apocalypse first made an impact in the mid-1980s when Said Ayyub's Al-Masīh al-Dajjāl (The AntiChrist) started a whole new genre of Islamic "apocalyptic fiction" or "millenarian speculation" throughout the Arab world. The book was so successful Ayyub went on to write a half-dozen other spinoff books, inspired imitators who enjoyed even greater success (Muhammad Izzat Arif, Muhammad Isa Dawud, and Mansur AbdelHakim).

The book (and the genre) was noteworthy for rupturing the "organic link between Islamic tradition and the last days of the world", using Western sources (such as Gustave Le Bon and William Guy Carr) that previously would have been ignored; and lack of  Sahih Bukhari (i.e. top quality) hadith (he does quote Ibn Kathir and some hadith "repeated at second hand"); and for an obsessively anti-Jewish point of view ("in all great transformations of thought, there is a Jewish factor, avowed and plain, or else hidden and secret", "the Jews are planning the Third World War in order to eliminate the Islamic world and all opposition to Israel", and cover art featuring a grotesque cartoon figure with a Star of David and large hooked nose).

Unlike traditional popular works of Islamic eschatology that kept close to scripture and classical manuals of eschatology in describing al-Dajjāl, Said Ayyub portrayed the Dajjāl as 1) the true Jewish messiah, that Jews had been waiting for, 2) a figure who will appear or reappear not only in end times, but one who has been working throughout the history of humanity to create havoc with such diabolical success that human history is really "only a succession of nefarious maneuvers" by him.  Intermediaries of al-dajjal (according to Ayyub) include St. Paul the Apostle, who (Ayyub maintains) created Christianity by distorting the true story of Jesus, the Emperor Constantine who made possible "the Crusader state in service to the Jews", the Freemasons, Napoleon, the United States of America, Communists, Israel, etc.  He concludes that the dajjal is hiding in Palestine (but will also "appear in Khurasan as the head of an expansionist state") and the Great Battle between Muslims and his forces will be World War III fought in the Middle East.

Later books, The Hidden Link between the AntiChrist, the Secrets of the Bermuda Triangle, and Flying Saucers (1994), by Muhammad Isa Dawud, for example, move even farther away from traditional themes,  disclosing that the Anti-Christ journeyed from the Middle East to the archipelago of Bermuda in the 8th century CE to make it his home base and from whence he fomented the French Revolution and other mischief, and now sends flying saucers to patrol Egypt and prepare for his eventual triumphal return to Jerusalem.

The success of the genre provoked a "counteroffensive" by pious conservatives (Abdellatif Ashur, Muhammad Bayyumi Magdi, and Muhammad Shahawi) disturbed by the liberties Said Ayyub and others had taken with Islamic doctrine.

Jihadist references

In the early 1980s, when Abdullah Azzam, called on Muslims around the world to join the jihad in Afghanistan, he considered the fight "to be a sign that the end times were imminent".   Also around that time, popular Islamic writers, such as Said Ayyub, started blaming Islamic decline in the face of the Western world, not on lack of technology and development, but on the forces of the Dajjal.

Al-Qaeda used "apocalyptic predictions in both its internal and external messaging" according to Jessica Stern, and its use of "the name Khorasan, a region that includes part of Iran, Central Asia, and Afghanistan, and from which, it is prophesied, the Mahdi will emerge alongside an army bearing black flags", was thought to be a symbol of end times. But these claims were "mostly symbolic", and according to Wood, Bin Laden "rarely mentioned" the Apocalypse and when he did, "he implied he would be long dead when it arrived" (a reflection of his more "elite" background according to Will McCants). According to J.-P. Filiu, out of the mass of Al-Qaeda documents seized after the fall of the Taliban, only one letter made any reference to the apocalypse.

A prominent jihadist, Abu Musʿab al-Sūri, (called a "sophisticated strategist" and "articulate exponent of the modern jihad"),  somewhat independent and critical of Al-Qaeda, was also much more interested in end times. He wrote, "I have no doubt that we have entered into the age of battles and tribulations [zāman al-malāhim wal-fitan]"  He devoted the last 100 pages of his magnum opus on jihad (A Call to Global Islamic Resistance, made available online around 2005) to matters such as the proper chronology and location of related battles and other activities  of the Mahdi, the Antichrist, the mountain of gold to be found in the Euphrates river, the Sufyani, Gog and Magog, etc.

Abu Musʿab al Zarqawi, the founder of what would become the Islamic State "injected" the apocalyptic message into jihad. ISIS has evoked "the apocalyptic tradition much more explicitly" than earlier jihadis. Dabiq, Syria –  a town understood "in some versions" of the eschatological "narrative to be a possible location for the final apocalyptic battle" –  was captured by ISIS and made its capital. ISIS also declared its "intent to conquer Constantinople" –  Muslims conquering Constantinople being another end times prophesy. Interviews by the New York Times, and Jurgen Todenhöfer with many dozens of Muslims who had traveled to fight with Islamic State, and by Graeme Wood with Islamic State supporters elsewhere, found "messianic expectation" a strong motivator to join Islamic State.
Shiʿi Islam
While Al-Qaeda and Islamic State are Sunni, Shia insurgents/militants have also been "drawn to the battlefield" by "apocalyptic belief", according to William McCants, who quotes a Shia fighter in Iraq saying, “'I was waiting for the day when I will fight in Syria. Thank God he chose me to be one of the Imam's soldiers.'” 

Some dissident Shiʿa in Iraq, oppose not only Sunni, US and Iraqi government forces, but the Shiʿi religious hierarchy as well.  In Najaf, in late January 2007, at least 200 were killed in the Battle of Najaf,
 when several hundred members of an armed Iraqi Shi'a messianic sect known as the Soldiers of Heaven or Jund As-Samāʾ(), allegedly attempted to  start a "messianic insurrection" during the holy day of Ashura in the holy city of Najaf; planning to disguise themselves as pilgrims and kill leading Shi'a clerics. The group allegedly believed that spreading chaos would hasten the return of the 12th Imam/Mahdi,  or alternately, that their leader, Dia Abdul Zahra Kadim, was the awaited Mahdi. The next year during Ashura a reported 18 officers and 53 militia members were killed in clashes between "millenarian rebels" and police, the violence blamed on followers of one Ahmad al-Hassan, a man claiming the Hidden Iman had designated him as his (the Hidden Imam's) representative (wassi), and who accused Ayatollahs/Shia clerics of being guilty of "aberration and treason, of occupation and tyranny".

Islamic State claims of prophecy fulfilment
Jihadis of the Islamic State see the fulfillment of many of the "lesser signs" of the coming of Judgement Day in current events. 
Its generally agreed that Israel Arab wars have been wars between Muslims and Jews (which were prophesied), and that moral standards have declined leading to  rampant fornication, alcohol consumption, and music listening. "A slave giving birth to her master" can happen when the child of a slave woman and the slave's owner inherits the slave after the owner's death—slavery being practiced in the Islamic State (until its defeat). An embargo of Iraq is alleged to be foretold in the hadith "Iraq would withhold its dirhams and qafiz". That Muslim states are being led by those who do not deserve to lead them, is an article of faith among jihadis and many other Muslims.  ISIS alleges that worship of the pre-Islamic deity al-Lat is being practiced by its Shia enemy Hezbollah.  The naked shepherds who will build tall buildings is interpreted to refer to  Gulf State builders of skyscrapers are "only a generation or two out of desert poverty".

But the Islamic State is also attempting to fulfill prophecies itself to hasten end times.
Zarqawi published "communiqués detailing the fulfillment of specific predictions" found in a famous book on jihad and end times called, A Call to a Global Islamic Resistance by Abu Musab al Suri.  His successor, Al-Baghdadi, took "the fulfillment of apocalyptic portents even more seriously". 
According to Hassan Abbas,  at least part of ISIS's motivation in killing and otherwise provoking Shia is to "deliberately ... instigate a war between Sunnis and Shi'a, in the belief that a sectarian war would be a sign that the final times has arrived"; and also explains the ISIS Siege of Kobanî: "In the eschatological literature, there is reference to crisis in Syria and massacre of Kurds—this is why Kobane is important."(The town of 45,000 was under siege by ISIS from September 2014 to January 2015.)

Thus, "ISIS's obsession with the end of the world" helps explain its lack of interest in the "ordinary moral rules" of the temporal world, according to Jessica Stern.
If you are "participating in a cosmic war between good and evil", (and if everyone will be dead and then resurrected relatively soon anyway), pedestrian concerns about saving the lives of the innocent are of little concern.

Questions and criticism
Among the problems critics see with some of the concepts of, and attention given to, the eschatology of Islam, are its effect on the socio-economic health of the Muslim world, the basis of the scripture (particularly the hadith) dealing with end times, and the rational implausibility of some of the theological concepts such as resurrection of the dead.

Mustafa Akyol criticizes the current focus of the Muslim community on apocalypticism and the use of the forces of the Dajjal to explain stagnation in the Muslim world in the past two centuries vis-à-vis the West (and now East Asia). He argues that if supernatural evil is believed to be the cause of the problems of Muslims, then practical solutions such as "science, economic development and liberal democracy" will be ignored in favor of divine intervention. (On the other hand, a sahih hadith reports Muhammad saying that "If the Final Hour comes while you have a shoot of a plant in your hands and it is possible to plant it before the Hour comes, you should plant it.") 

Western scholars (William McCants, Jane Smith, Yvonne Haddad, Jean-Pierre Filiu) agree that the apocalyptic narratives are strongly connected to the early jihad wars against the Byzantine Empire and civil wars against other Muslims.
McCants, writes that the fitan ("tribulations") of the minor and lesser signs come from the fitan of the early Islamic civil wars (First Fitna (656–661 CE), Second Fitna (c. 680/683–c. 685/692 CE), Third Fitna (744–750/752 CE)), where Muhammad's companions (Sahabah) and successor generations (Tabi'un and Taba Tabi'in) fought each other for political supremacy.  "Before and after each tribulation, partisans on both sides circulated prophecies in the name of the Prophet to support their champion. With time, the context was forgotten but the prophecies remained."  Smith and Haddad also write that "the political implications of the whole millennial idea in Islam, especially as related to the understanding of the mahdi and the rise of the 'Abbasids in the second Islamic century, are very difficult to separate from the eschatological ones."
They also argue that it's "difficult to determine whether" the Prophet Muḥammad "actually anticipated the arrival" the Mahdi as "an eschatological figure" –  despite the fact that "most of the traditions about the Mahdi are credited to  Muḥammad.
Filiu  has also stated that "the apocalyptic narrative was decisively influenced by the conflicts that filled Islam's early years, campaigns and jihad against the Byzantine Empire and recurrent civil wars among Muslims."
Consequently, the reliability of hadith on end times has been questioned.

Skepticism of the concept of the resurrection of the dead has been part of both "the compatriots" of Muhammad and the "rational and scientifically-infused" inhabitants of the contemporary world.
The fact of the resurrection of the body has been of continuing importance to Muslims and has raised very particular questions in certain circles of Islamic thought, such as those reflected in the later disputations between philosophy and theology. 
It was not really a point of issue for early Islam, however, and bodily resurrection has never been seriously denied by orthodoxy. It is, as many have observed, basic to the message of God as proclaimed by the Prophet and articulated clearly by the Qur'an, especially in those passages in which the contemporaries of the Prophet are presented as having scoffed or raised doubts. It continues to be, ... a point of conviction for many of the contemporary interpreters of Islam to a world in which a rational and scientifically-infused populace continues to raise the same eyebrows of skepticism as did the compatriots of the Prophet.

Early skeptics being quoted in the Quran as saying: "Are we to be returned to our former state when we have become decayed bones? They say, that would be a detrimental return!" (Q79: 10–12).

Visitation of tombs

Death is also seen as a homecoming. When people visit tombs, they are having a specific spiritual routine. The correct way to visit someone's tomb is to recite parts of the Quran and pray for the deceased.

Literature on Islamic eschatology
The writings of five medieval Sunni scholars  on Islamic eschatology stand out for their "depth and originality", according to Jean-Pierre Filiu. Taking a work by each of them on the subject of the signs of end times, (or that includes the subject of the signs of end times), Filiu points out their characteristics, differences, and influences (where the Mahdi will first appear, where Jesus will descend to, how many human and angel warriors will fight with the Mahdi, etc.).
 Ibn Arabi (1165–1240 CE), Al-futūhāt al-makkiyya (Meccan Illuminations); Among other things, Ibn Arabi wrote that "70,000 Muslim, all descended from Isaac" would follow the Mahdi and chanting "Allahu Akbar!", and crumble the ramparts of Constantinople; The Great Battle would take place on the plain of Acre.
 Al-Qurtubi (1214-1273 CE), Al-tadhkira fī ahwāl al-mawtā wa umūr al-ahkīra (Remembrance of the Affairs of the Dead and Matters of the Hereafter); Known for his opposition to both partisanship in Islam and the Umayyad dynasty, Al-Qurtubi prophesied the Mahdi would emerge in Morocco and preach there for ten years before rescuing the Muslims of Spain and moving on to conquer the Byzantines. 
 Ibn Kathir (c. 1300–1373 CE), Ashrāt al-sāʿat (Signs of the Hour); Popular among the ulama and common people of Syria for his preaching of strictness, Ibn Kathir  had a highly developed vision of the signs of the Last Hour. The Mahdi was distinct from the Shia Hidden Imam; there would be great battles between Muslims and Byzantines, and then with the forces of the Dajjal.
 Ibn Khaldun (1332–1406), Kitāb al-ʿibar (Book of Examples); Despite his association with modernism, Ibn Khaldun thought none of what was mentioned in the Quran of "the hour" and its signs was "subject to the least ambiguity"; he endorsed apocalyptic hadith in the collections of Bukhari and Muslim (but not other collections), as well as the "classical scenario" of end times.   
 Jalal al-Din al-Suyuti (1446-1505), fatwa on "the descent of Jesus, son of Mary at the end times" from Al-hāwī lil-fatāwī. Al-Suyuti preached against the millenarian claim that the earth would end in 1000 A.H. (1591 C.E.), believing Judgement Day would come in 1500 A.H. (2076 C.E.).
Ibn al-Nafis (1213-1288 CE), Theologus Autodidactus (circa CE 1270). In the form of a theological fiction novel, he wrote on Islamic eschatology where he used reason, science, and early Islamic philosophy to explain how he believed al-Qiyamah would unfold.

Contemporary literature
Imran Nazar Hosein (b.1942 CE) wrote numerous books that deal with Islamic eschatology (Ilmu Ākhir al-Zamān – Knowledge of the later days), among which the most famous is Jerusalem in the Qur'an.

Said Ayyub's  Al-Masīh al-Dajjāl (often translated as The AntiChrist) came out in August 1986,  (see above) was enormously popular and started a new genre of Islamic "apocalyptic fiction" that added western themes such as flying saucers, the Bermuda Triangle and European Antisemitism to traditional Islamic eschatology.

See also

References

Notes

Citations

Bibliography

 
 
 
 
 
 
 

 
 
 
 
 
 
 
 
 
 
 
 

 
 
 
 
 
 
 
 
 
 
 {{cite book |last1=Smith |first1=Jane I. |first2=Yvonne Y. |last2=Haddad |date=1981 |title=The Islamic Understanding of Death and Resurrection |location=Albany, N Y |publisher=SUNY Press |url=https://vdoc.pub/download/the-islamic-understanding-of-death-and-resurrection-1fa354cla15g |ref=JISYYHIU1981 }}
 
 
 
 

ISIS, 2022

Further reading
 "Fath al-Bari" (from Sahih al-Bukhari by ibn Hajar al-Asqalani).
 Esposito, John, The Oxford Dictionary of Islam, Oxford University Press, 2003, .
 Richard C. Martin, Said Amir Arjomand, Marcia Hermansen, Abdulkader Tayob, Rochelle Davis, John Obert Voll, Encyclopedia of Islam and the Muslim World, MacMillan Reference Books, 2003, .
 Lawson, Todd (1999). Duality, Opposition and Typology in the Qur'an: The Apocalyptic Substrate''.     Journal of Quranic Studies. 10: 23–49.